The biosynthesis of isoflavonoids involves several enzymes; These are:

Liquiritigenin,NADPH:oxygen oxidoreductase (hydroxylating, aryl migration), also known as Isoflavonoid synthase, is an enzyme that uses liquiritigenin (a flavanone), O2, NADPH and H+ to produce 2,7,4'-trihydroxyisoflavanone (an isoflavonoid), H2O and NADP+.

 Biochanin-A reductase
 Flavone synthase
 2'-hydroxydaidzein reductase
 2-hydroxyisoflavanone dehydratase
 2-hydroxyisoflavanone synthase
 Isoflavone 4'-O-methyltransferase
 Isoflavone 7-O-methyltransferase
 Isoflavone 2'-hydroxylase
 Isoflavone 3'-hydroxylase
 Isoflavone-7-O-beta-glucoside 6"-O-malonyltransferase
 Isoflavone 7-O-glucosyltransferase
 4'-methoxyisoflavone 2'-hydroxylase

Pterocarpans biosynthesis 
 3,9-dihydroxypterocarpan 6a-monooxygenase
 Glyceollin synthase
 Pterocarpin synthase

See also 
 Flavonoid biosynthesis

References

External links 
 http://www.genome.jp/kegg/pathway/map/map00943.html 

Isoflavonoids metabolism
Biosynthesis